R48 may refer to:

Roads 
 R48 expressway (Czech Republic), now the D48 motorway
 R48 (South Africa)

Other uses 
 , a destroyer of the Royal Navy
 R48: Danger of serious damage to health by prolonged exposure, a risk phrase